Bezirk Melk (Central Bavarian: Beziak Möck) is a district of the state of Lower Austria in Austria.

Municipalities
Suburbs, hamlets and other subdivisions of a municipality are indicated in small characters.
Artstetten-Pöbring
Aichau, Artstetten, Dölla, Fritzelsdorf, Hart, Hasling, Lohsdorf, Nussendorf, Oberndorf, Payerstetten, Pleißing, Pöbring, Schwarzau, Trennegg, Unterbierbaum
Bergland
Bergland, Gumprechtsberg, Holzing, Landfriedstetten, Plaika, Ratzenberg, Ratzenberg, Wohlfahrtsbrunn
Bischofstetten
Bischofstetten, Buchgraben, Christenberg, Dörfl, Großa, Grünwies, Haag, Haberg, Hanau, Hintergrub, Mitterschildbach, Neubing, Niederbauern, Oberschildbach, Oberweg, Rametzhofen, Sierning, Strohdorf, Tonach, Unterschildbach, Unterweg, Winkelsdorf, Zauching
Blindenmarkt
Atzelsdorf, Blindenmarkt, Kottingburgstall, Weitgraben
Dorfstetten
Forstamt, Wimbergeramt
Dunkelsteinerwald
Aichberg, Besenbuch, Bichl, Bittersbach, Dürnbach, Eckartsberg, Gansbach, Gerolding, Häusling, Heitzing, Hessendorf, Himberg, Hohenwarth, Kicking, Kochholz, Krapfenberg, Lanzing, Lerchfeld, Lottersberg, Maierhöfen, Mauer bei Melk, Neu-Gerolding, Neuhofen, Nölling, Nonnenhöfen, Oed, Ohnreith, Pfaffing bei Mauer, Pinnenhöfen, Schwaigbichl, Thal, Umbach, Ursprung
Emmersdorf an der Donau
Emmersdorf an der Donau, Fahnsdorf, Goßam, Grimsing, Hain, Hofamt, Luberegg, Mödelsdorf, Pömling, Rantenberg, Reith, Schallemmersdorf, St. Georgen
Erlauf
Erlauf, Harlanden, Knocking, Maierhofen, Niederndorf, Ofling, Steinwand, Wolfring
Golling an der Erlauf
Golling, Hinterleiten, Neuda, Sittenberg
Hofamt Priel
Hofamt Priel, Rottenberg, Rottenhof, Weins, Ysperdorf
Hürm
Arnersdorf, Atzing, Diendorf, Grub, Hainberg, Harmersdorf, Hösing, Hürm, Inning, Kronaberg, Löbersdorf, Maxenbach, Mitterradl, Murschratten, Neustift bei Sooß, Oberhaag, Oberradl, Ober-Siegendorf, Ober-Thurnhofen, Pöttendorf, Scharagraben, Schlatzendorf, Seeben, Sooß, Unterhaag, Unter-Siegendorf, Unter-Thurnhofen
Kilb
Braunöd, Bühren, Dörfl, Dornhof, Feld, Fleischessen, Fohra, Fohrafeld, Freyen, Gartling, Glosbach, Graben, Graben bei Haag, Grub bei Kilb, Guglberg, Hauersdorf, Haxenöd, Heinrichsberg, Hohenbrand, Hummelbach, Kettenreith, Kilb, Kohlenberg, Laach, Maierhöfen, Mallau, Niederhofen, Oberneuberg, Panschach, Petersberg, Rametzberg, Ranzenbach, Ruttersdorf, Schlögelsbach, Schützen, Taubenwang, Teufelsdorf, Umbach, Unterneuberg, Unterschmidbach, Volkersdorf, Waasen bei Kilb, Wiesenöd, Wötzling
Kirnberg an der Mank
Artlehen, Außerreith, Furth, Innerreith, Kimming, Kirnberg an der Mank, Kroisbach, Maierhöfen, Obergraben, Oed an der Mank, Pöllaberg, Ranitzhof, Sattlehen, Strohhof, Untergraben, Wolfsbach, Wolfsbach, Wolfsmath
Klein-Pöchlarn
Krummnußbaum
Annastift, Diedersdorf, Holzern, Krummnußbaum, Neustift, Wallenbach
Leiben
Ebersdorf, Kaumberg, Lehen, Leiben, Losau, Mampasberg, Urfahr, Weinzierl, Weitenegg
Loosdorf
Albrechtsberg an der Pielach, Loosdorf, Neubach, Rohr, Sitzenthal
Mank
Aichen, Altenhofen, Anzenbach, Bodendorf, Busendorf, Dorna, Fohra, Fritzberg, Gries, Großaigen, Hagberg, Hörgstberg, Hörsdorf, Kälberhart, Kleinaigen, Kleinzell, Lehen, Loipersdorf, Loitsbach, Loitsdorf, Mank, Massendorf, Münichhofen, Nacht, Oberschmidbach, Pichlreit, Pölla, Poppendorf,  Ritzenberg, Rührsdorf, Simonsberg, St. Frein, St. Haus, Strannersdorf, Wies, Wolkersdorf
Marbach an der Donau
Auratsberg, Friesenegg, Granz, Kracking, Krummnußbaum an der Donauuferbahn, Marbach an der Donau, Schaufel
Maria Taferl
Maria Taferl, Obererla, Oberthalheim, Reitern, Untererla, Unterthalheim, Unterthalheim, Wimm
Melk
Großpriel, Kollapriel, Melk, Pielach, Pielachberg, Pöverding, Rosenfeld, Schrattenbruck, Spielberg, Winden
Münichreith-Laimbach
Edelsreith, Eggathon, Gmaining, Kehrbach, Kollnitz, Laimbach am Ostrong, Mayerhofen, Münichreith, Pargatstetten, Rappoltenreith
Neumarkt an der Ybbs
Kemmelbach, Neumarkt an der Ybbs
Nöchling
Artneramt, Baumgartenberg, Freigericht, Gulling, Mitterndorf, Niederndorf, Niederndorf, Nöchling
Persenbeug-Gottsdorf
Gottsdorf, Hagsdorf, Loja, Metzling, Persenbeug
Petzenkirchen
Pöchlarn
Am Rechen, Brunn an der Erlauf, Ornding, Pöchlarn, Rampersdorf, Röhrapoint, Wörth
Pöggstall
Annagschmais, Arndorf, Aschelberg, Bergern, Brennhof, Bruck am Ostrong, Dietsam, Gerersdorf, Gottsberg, Grub bei Aschelberg, Grub bei Neukirchen am Ostrong, Haag, Krempersbach, Krumling, Laas, Landstetten, Loibersdorf, Muckendorf, Mürfelndorf, Neukirchen am Ostrong, Oberbierbaum, Oberdörfl, Oberhohenau, Oed, Pöggstall, Pömmerstall, Prinzelndorf, Sading, Straßreith, Unterhohenau, Wachtberg, Weinling, Weißpyhra, Würnsdorf, Würnsdorf, Zöbring
Raxendorf
Afterbach, Braunegg, Eibetsberg, Feistritz, Klebing, Laufenegg, Lehsdorf, Mannersdorf, Moos, Neudorf, Neusiedl am Feldstein, Neusiedl bei Pfaffenhof, Ottenberg, Ottenberg, Pfaffenhof, Pölla, Raxendorf, Robans, Steinbach, Troibetsberg, Walkersdorf, Zehentegg, Zeining, Zogelsdorf
Ruprechtshofen
Baulanden, Brunnwiesen, Etzen, Fittenberg, Fohregg, Geretzbach, Graben, Grabenegg, Grub, Hofstetten, Hofstetten, Hohentann, Hub, Kagelsberg, Kalcha, Koth, Kronberg, Kühberg, Lasserthal, Lehen, Naspern, Ockert, Oed, Rainberg, Reisenhof, Riegers, Rottenhof, Ruprechtshofen, Schlatten, Simhof, Sinhof, Weghof, Wies, Zinsenhof, Zwerbach
Sankt Leonhard am Forst
Aichbach, Altenhofen, Apfaltersbach, Au, Brandstatt bei Au, Brandstatt bei Oed, Dangelsbach, Diesendorf, Eisguggen, Eselsteiggraben, Fachelberg, Gassen, Geigenberg, Grillenreith, Grimmegg, Großweichselbach, Grub bei Harbach, Haindorf, Harbach, Haslach, Hochstraß, Hohenreith, Hörgerstall, Hub an der Mank, Kerndl, Kleinweichselbach, Kühberg, Lachau, Lehenleiten, Lunzen, Neusiedl, Oed bei Haslach, Pöllendorf, Pühra, Reith bei Vornholz, Reith bei Weichselbach, Rinn, Ritzenberg, Ritzengrub, Sandeben, Schönbuch, Schweining, Seimetzbach, St. Leonhard am Forst, Steghof, Steinbach, Straß, Thal, Urbach, Vornholz, Wegscheid, Ziegelstadl
Sankt Martin-Karlsbach
Ennsbach, Hengstberg, Karlsbach, Neuhaus, St. Martin am Ybbsfelde
Sankt Oswald
Fünflingeramt, Loseneggeramt, St. Oswald, Stiegeramt, Urthaleramt
Schollach
Anzendorf, Groß-Schollach, Klein-Schollach, Merkendorf, Roggendorf, Schallaburg, Steinparz
Schönbühel-Aggsbach
Aggsbach-Dorf, Aggstein, Berging, Gschwendt, Hub, Schönbühel an der Donau, Siedelgraben, Wolfstein
Texingtal
Altendorf, Bach, Fischbach, Großmaierhof, Haberleiten, Hinterberg, Hinterholz, Hinterleiten, Kleinmaierhof, Mühlgraben, Panholz, Plankenstein, Reinöd, Rosenbichl, Schwaighof, Sonnleithen, St. Gotthard, Steingrub, Straß bei Texing, Texing, Walzberg, Weißenbach
Weiten
Eibetsberg, Eitental, Filsendorf, Jasenegg, Mollenburg, Mollendorf, Mörenz, Nasting, Rafles, Seiterndorf, Streitwiesen, Tottendorf, Weiten, Weiterndorf
Ybbs an der Donau
Donaudorf, Göttsbach, Sarling, Sarling, Säusenstein, Ybbs an der Donau
Yspertal
Haslau, Kapelleramt, Nächst Altenmarkt, Wimberg, Yspertal
Zelking-Matzleinsdorf
Anzenberg, Anzenberg, Arb, Bergern, Einsiedl, Freiningau, Gassen, Hofstetten, Maierhöfen, Mannersdorf, Matzleinsdorf, Zelking

 
Districts of Lower Austria